St Brigid's GAA may refer to:

St Brigid's GAA (Dublin), a sports club in Castleknock, Fingal, Ireland
St Brigid's Killashee, a sports club in County Longford, Ireland
St Brigid's, a sports club in Ballinacree, County Meath, Ireland
St Brigid's GAA (Roscommon), a sports club in Kiltoom and Cam, Ireland
St Brigid's, a sports club in Dalystown, County Westmeath, Ireland

See also
CLG Naomh Bríd, a sports club in Donegal, Ireland
St Brigid's GAC (Antrim), a sports club in Belfast